Eatoniella perforata is a species of marine gastropod mollusc in the family Eatoniellidae. First described by Winston Ponder in 1965, it is endemic to the waters of New Zealand. Compared to most other Eatoniella species of New Zealand, E. perforata is found in relatively deep water.

Description

Eatoniella perforata has a small, white ovate shell, with four and half whorls. The holotype measured 1.25mm by 0.83mm.

Distribution

The species is endemic to New Zealand. The holotype was collected by W. La Roche from Doubtless Bay, Northland Region, from a depth of 22 metres. The mollusc is found to the north-east of the North Island, in moderately deep water, and has also been identified on the Chatham Islands and Auckland Islands.

References

Eatoniellidae
Gastropods described in 1965
Gastropods of New Zealand
Endemic fauna of New Zealand
Endemic molluscs of New Zealand
Molluscs of the Pacific Ocean
Taxa named by Winston Ponder